August Johannes Jaeger (18 March 1860 – 18 May 1909) was an Anglo-German music publisher, who developed a close friendship with the English composer Edward Elgar.  He offered advice and help to Elgar and is immortalised in the Enigma Variations.

Biography
August Johannes Jaeger was born in Düsseldorf, Germany. He came to London in 1878, where he first worked at a map-printing firm. In 1890 he joined the London music publishing company Novello as a music reader.  He became head of the publishing office.

Elgar's relationship with Jaeger is documented in Percy M. Young's book showing eleven years of correspondence, Letters to Nimrod. Jaeger met Edward Elgar in late 1897, when he was publishing office manager at Novellos, and their first correspondence was regarding the publication of Elgar's Te Deum and Benedictus. His advice, friendship and encouragement became invaluable to Elgar, for example causing the composer to rework many famous musical passages, including the finale to his Variations on an Original Theme (Enigma Variations) and the climax of The Dream of Gerontius.  Jaeger has been immortalized in the famous ninth variation "Nimrod" from the Variations, recalling a conversation on the slow movements of Beethoven (Nimrod was a Biblical hunter, a pun on the German word for hunter, Jäger).

Jaeger championed the work of the young composer Samuel Coleridge-Taylor, claiming to Elgar that Coleridge-Taylor was "a genius".

In 1898 Jaeger married Isabella Donkersley of Magdale, Honley near Holmfirth in West Yorkshire, an accomplished violinist and pupil of Henry Holmes in the Royal College of Music, and they had two children.

At the beginning of 1905 Jaeger was ill with tuberculosis and went to Davos in Switzerland, but he was still receiving a pension from Novellos. After the long and depressing illness, during which he and Elgar still corresponded about musical matters, Jaeger died in Muswell Hill on 18 May 1909.

The family later changed their name to the anglicized "Hunter" after World War I.

Works 
 Analytical and descriptive notes for works by Elgar: The Apostles (1903); The Dream of Gerontius (1904); The Kingdom (1906); Falstaff
 Notes for Queens Hall concert programmes (1903-1906)

References

Bibliography

External links
 

1860 births
1909 deaths
People from Muswell Hill
Edward Elgar
People from Düsseldorf
English composers
German music publishers (people)
British music publishers (people)
Businesspeople from London
19th-century English musicians
19th-century British male musicians
German emigrants to the United Kingdom
19th-century English businesspeople